Eucalyptus zopherophloia, commonly known as the blackbutt mallee, is a species of spreading mallee that is endemic to an area on the west coast of Western Australia. It has rough bark over part or all of the trunk, smooth grey bark above, narrow lance-shaped leaves, flower buds in groups of nine or eleven, creamy white flowers and conical fruit.

Description
It has rough, fibrous bark over part or all of the trunks, smooth grey bark above. Flowering occurs between October and January and the flowers are creamy white.

Taxonomy and naming
Eucalyptus zopherophloia was first formally described by the botanists Ian Brooker and Stephen Hopper in 1993 in the journal Nuytsia from specimens collected by Brooker in 1986 at an area north of Coolimba. The specific epithet (zopherophloia) is from ancient Greek words meaning "dusky" and "bark".

Distribution and habitat
Blackbutt mallee is found in coastal areas between Jurien Bay and Zuytdorp Cliffs where it grows in grey or white sand with limestone rubble.

Conservation status
This eucalypt is classified as "Priority Four" by the Government of Western Australia Department of Parks and Wildlife, meaning that is rare or near threatened.

See also
List of Eucalyptus species

References

zopherophloia
Myrtales of Australia
Plants described in 1993
Eucalypts of Western Australia
Mallees (habit)
Taxa named by Ian Brooker
Taxa named by Stephen Hopper